Albert Ward may refer to:
 Albert Ward (cricketer, born 1865) (1865–1939), English first-class cricketer
 Albert Ward (cricketer, born 1896) (1896–1979), English cricketer
 Albert Ward (film director) (1870–1956), British screenwriter and film director
 Sir Albert Lambert Ward, 1st Baronet (1865–1939), British Conservative Member of Parliament
 Reg Ward (Albert Joseph Ward, 1927–2011), first Chief Executive of the London Docklands Development Corporation